Omorgus asperulatus is a species of hide beetle in the subfamily Omorginae and subgenus Afromorgus.

References

asperulatus
Beetles described in 1872